Tim Hambly (born June 26, 1983) is an American professional ice hockey defenseman. He is currently an unrestricted free agent who most recently played for Krefeld Pinguine in the Deutsche Eishockey Liga (DEL).

Playing career 
Hambly enrolled at the University of Minnesota Duluth in 2001 and appeared in a total of 141 games for the Bulldogs until 2005, while scoring 13 goals and assisting on 47. In his junior year, Minnesota-Duluth advanced to the Frozen Four.

He made his debut as a professional ice hockey player during the 2004-05 season with the Las Vegas Wranglers of the East Coast Hockey League. Including the following season, he played 39 games for the Wranglers. The 2005-06 campaign also saw Hambly take his game to the American Hockey League and represent the Iowa Stars as well as the Omaha Ak-Sar-Ben Knights. He played three more years in the AHL, before landing his first job in Europe: In 2009–10, he signed with ERC Ingolstadt of the German top flight Deutsche Eishockey Liga (DEL) and remained with the club until 2014. In his last season (2013–14) in Ingolstadt, he helped ERC capture the DEL championship, serving as an assistant captain.

He signed with fellow DEL side Grizzly Adams Wolfsburg for the 2014–15 season and then had his contract renewed for the following campaign.

References

External links

1983 births
Living people
American men's ice hockey defensemen
ERC Ingolstadt players
Iowa Stars players
Krefeld Pinguine players
Las Vegas Wranglers players
Minnesota Duluth Bulldogs men's ice hockey players
Ice hockey players from Minnesota
Omaha Ak-Sar-Ben Knights players
Quad City Flames players
Rockford IceHogs (AHL) players
Waterloo Black Hawks players
Grizzlys Wolfsburg players
Nippon Paper Cranes players